Rudra Pratap is an Indian academician and the vice-chancellor of Plaksha University, Mohali. Previously, he was a professor of Mechanical Engineering at the Indian Institute of Science (IISc), Bangalore. Among other research interests, he works in the field of Microelectromechanical systems (MEMS) and used to head India's first research lab in the field of Microelectromechanical systems, the CranesSci MEMS Lab at Indian Institute of Science, Bangalore. His book on MATLAB Getting Started with MATLAB 7 is popular among the students of engineering. He is also the Chair for the Centre of Nanoscience and Engineering (CeNSE).

Pratap is an Associate Editor of Shock and Vibration Journal which publishes articles on various aspects of  shocks and vibration including vibration measurements, vibration condition monitoring, shock hardening, fluid-structure interaction, impact biodynamics, vehicle dynamics, and gun dynamics.

Education and work
Pratap obtained his B.Tech from the Indian Institute of Technology, Kharagpur in the year 1985. He then obtained his MS from University of Arizona, Tucson in the year 1987 followed by PhD from Cornell University, Ithaca in the year 1993. He joined Indian Institute of Science in the year 1996.

Books authored
 Getting Started with MATLAB 7: A Quick Introduction for Scientists and Engineers, Oxford University Press, 2005.
 Introduction to Statics and Dynamics, with Andy Ruina, Oxford University press, 2002.

References

External links
 China may beat US in science, technology
 Nanotechnology: India lagging far behind other nations, says expert
 Lack of information flow a major hurdle for nanotechnology

Year of birth missing (living people)
Living people
Academic staff of the Indian Institute of Science
Indian mechanical engineers